American singer and songwriter Kelis has released six studio albums, one live album, one compilation album, 39 singles (including 21 as a featured artist), and 29 music videos. At age 16, she left her parents' home; at the age of 20 she was signed to Virgin Records. Her debut single, "Caught Out There", was released in 1999, reaching number 54 on the Billboard Hot 100 and number four in the United Kingdom. Her debut album, Kaleidoscope, was released in December 1999 and charted at number 144 on the Billboard 200, and has sold 249,000 copies in the country to date. In the United Kingdom, it was certified gold and has sold over 167,000 copies. Two more singles were released from the album: "Good Stuff" which reached the UK top twenty and "Get Along with You" which failed to chart in the US and charted poorly in the UK. In 2001, her second studio album, Wanderland, was released and featured similar "raw emotion and sophisticated musicianship" of her debut album. The album was not released in the United States, however, and the only single, "Young, Fresh n' New", charted poorly.

In 2003, she signed with Arista Records and released the single "Milkshake". The song reached number three on the US Billboard Hot 100, becoming her best-charting single to date. The song was the lead single for the album Tasty, which was released in December 2003. Arista later folded (although it would be relaunched in 2018) and Kelis was transferred to Jive Records. In Europe, she was still signed to Virgin, and singles continued to be released there. Tasty was certified gold in the United States, becoming Kelis' first album to be certified by the Recording Industry Association of America. It has sold 535,000 copies in the US to date. In 2006, her next album, Kelis Was Here, was released on Jive Records. The album was preceded by the lead single, "Bossy". The single was certified double platinum in the US and reached the top twenty of the US Hot 100. The album debuted at number ten on the US Billboard 200 and has sold 160,000 copies in the United States to date. The album's third single, "Lil Star", features Cee-Lo Green, and reached number three in the UK and number eight in Ireland.

In late 2007, Jive dropped Kelis, and she signed to Interscope Records and will.i.am Music Group in 2009. She released her fifth studio album, Flesh Tone, in May 2010. The album saw Kelis departing from her previous R&B sound, and adapting a new dance sound. The album was preceded by the lead single, "Acapella", and spawned three singles that achieved moderate success in the charts; "4th of July (Fireworks)", "Scream" and "Brave". In 2011, Kelis began work on the follow up to Flesh Tone, however, she left Interscope and signed to Federal Prism, before officially signing to the British independent label Ninja Tune for the release of Food. The album was released on April 18, 2014, and is an R&B and soul album with a diverse musical style that incorporates funk, Afrobeat, Memphis soul, R&B and neo-soul. Its songs feature crackling horns, brass, earthy guitars, simmering electronics and vocals from Kelis that were noted as being breathy, smoky and sultry. The album was viewed as a return to Kelis' previous music prior to Flesh Tone, and was described by her as "a kind of unspoken lovefest".

Albums

Studio albums

Live albums

Compilation albums

Singles

As lead artist

As featured artist

Other charted songs

Guest appearances

Music videos

Notes

References

External links
 
 
 
 

Discography
Discographies of American artists
Rhythm and blues discographies